Dolphin is an unincorporated community in San Juan County in the U.S. state of Washington.

History
A post office called Dolphin was established in 1908 and remained in operation until 1924. The community was named for a dolphin marine structure near the original town site.

References

Unincorporated communities in San Juan County, Washington
Unincorporated communities in Washington (state)